Hate Made Me is the first album by New Zealand metal band 8 Foot Sativa. It was released in New Zealand on 3 March 2002 by Intergalactic Records. It was later released worldwide on 18 October 2004 by Black Mark Records. The album has hit gold status within New Zealand.

Track listing
 Before Your Suffering  – 2:47
 Hate Made Me  – 3:04
 Fuel Set  – 3:46
 Cocktease  – 3:26
 Believer  – 3:34
 It's All So Real  – 3:02
 Grown Aggression  – 4:17
 Stolen Life  – 3:38
 Kick It All Away  – 3:53
 8 Foot Sativa  – 3:35
 Engine  – 3:48
 Invention 13  – 1:58

The album's eponymous track, "8 Foot Sativa" is generally regarded as their signature song.

The track "8 Foot Sativa" was used prominently on an episode of Monster Garage, where a semi was converted into a 3-wheeled motorbike.

Credits
 Justin 'Jackhammer' Niessen - vocals
 Gary Smith - Guitar
 Brent Fox - Bass guitar
 Peter 'Speed' Young - drums

Charts

2002 albums
8 Foot Sativa albums